Brockhollands is a hamlet located in the Forest of Dean. It lies between the village of Bream and the town of Lydney in Gloucestershire. It is an obscure and small area with around 30 houses and is relatively unknown even in the local area.
With its only attributes being the local sheep farm, it rarely sees any tourism but is frequently driven through by those going up to Bream.

History
A farmhouse was recorded from 1578 at Brockhollands. The hamlet of Brockhollands formed in the 19th century north-west of the ancient farmstead. There was mining in the area, and in the early 1930s a miners' welfare committee built a small hall at Brockhollands.

References

External links

Forest of Dean
Hamlets in Gloucestershire